The McCrory-Mayfield House is a historic log house in Brentwood, Tennessee, U.S.. It was built in 1798 by Thomas McCrory, a settler and veteran of the American Revolution. Thomas came to Tennessee to claim some of the land granted by the United States government to his late father, Captain Thomas McCrory who died from wounds inflicted at the Battle of Germantown in 1777.

The land was later purchased by William B. Carpenter in 1837. After the American Civil War, it was inherited by his daughter Mary and her husband, George Mayfield, in 1869. It stayed in the Mayfield family until 1939. It has been listed on the National Register of Historic Places since December 27, 1982.

References

Houses on the National Register of Historic Places in Tennessee
Houses completed in 1798
Houses in Nashville, Tennessee